The Episcopal Diocese of Eastern Oregon is the diocese of the Episcopal Church in the United States of America which has jurisdiction over Oregon east of the Cascade Mountains. It also includes Klickitat County, Washington. It is in Province 8. The diocesan office is in Cove, Oregon.

History
The Diocese of Eastern Oregon was created as a missionary district from the Episcopal Diocese of Oregon in 1907 and became a separate diocese in 1971.

Leadership 
Following the resignation in 2007 of the 6th Bishop of Eastern Oregon, William O. Gregg, to become assistant bishop in the Episcopal Diocese of North Carolina, the diocesan leadership concluded that it was not financially possible to appoint another diocesan bishop for the time being. Instead, it was proposed that a Provisional Bishop be appointed on a part-time basis for a period of three years in the first instance.

In March 2009, the Standing Committee of the Diocese appointed Nedi Rivera, Bishop Suffragan of the Episcopal Diocese of Olympia since 2004, as Assisting Bishop. Rivera was subsequently elected and installed as Provisional Bishop at the Diocesan Convention on May 23, 2009, for a three-year term to Spring 2012, serving on a fractional time (one third) basis. In Spring 2012, Rivera's term as Provisional Bishop was extended by one year, ending in March 2015.

On December 12, 2015 Patrick W. Bell was elected as the seventh Bishop of the diocese. Bell, who was serving as pastor of St. Luke's Episcopal Church in Coeur d’Alene, Idaho, was consecrated as bishop in April 2016. Bell announced his intention to continue to reside in Coeur d’Alene and commute to Oregon for his work as Bishop.

List of bishops

References

External links

Eastern Oregon, Episcopal Diocese of
Christian organizations established in 1970
Episcopal Church in Oregon
Province 8 of the Episcopal Church (United States)